Coniogyra is a genus of moth in the family Gelechiidae. It contains the species Coniogyra dilucescens, which is found in Zimbabwe.

The wingspan is about 7 mm. The forewings are whitish, in the disc with a few grey scales, towards the margins rather strongly irrorated (speckled) with dark grey. The plical and second discal stigmata are obscure and grey. The hindwings are pale grey.

References

Endemic fauna of Zimbabwe
Gelechiinae
Taxa named by Edward Meyrick
Moth genera